Hortobágyi palacsinta is a savoury Hungarian crêpe dish, filled with meat (usually veal). The meat is prepared as a stew with onions and spices—similar to pörkölt or chicken paprikash—using veal, veal with mushrooms, chicken or Hungarian sausage. The crêpes are filled with the stew, tucking in the ends, and are baked in the oven with a paprika and tejföl (sour cream) sauce, then topped with fresh parsley. A popular serving option in Hungary to roll up the filled crêpes, or fold them into half and then rolling them up on the shorter side. The rolled up crêpes then can be stacked on each other with the sauce poured over them. 

The dish is unrelated to Hortobágy or the Hortobágy region of the Great Hungarian Plain. It was invented for the 1958 Brussels World Fair.

Gallery

See also 

 List of veal dishes

References 

Hungarian cuisine
Pancakes
Beef dishes
Veal dishes
Food and drink introduced in 1958